The Polish 7th Pomeranian Coastal Defence Brigade is a mechanized infantry brigade of the Polish Land Forces (based at Słupsk).

History
It was formed in 2001 from the 7th Pomeranian Mechanized Brigade (of the 8th Coastal Defence Division). Now it is a brigade of the 12th Mechanized Division based at Szczecin. It bears traditions of the disbanded 7th Sea Landing Division (known as the Blue Berets), previously themselves the 23rd Landing Division (:pl:23 Dywizja Desantowa) from 1958–63, therefore it is sometimes referred to the marines of Poland, modeled after the French Troupes de marine of the French Army. The 7th Sea Landing Division was reportedly involved in internal security tasks during the disturbances of 1981-82, according to contemporary NATO assessments.

However, as of 2007 there are no plans by the Polish Land Forces to create an active marine unit. Therefore, the 7th Brigade carries out only limited-scale exercises of amphibious assaults.

The brigade is also the de facto successor of the 1st and 2nd Marine Rifle Regiments that were formed for the 1939 Nazi invasion of Poland.

Structure
It consists of the following subunits:
 7th Coastal Defense Brigade in Słupsk
 Command Battalion in Słupsk
 1st Mechanised Battalion in Lębork with BMP-1 infantry fighting vehicles
 2nd Mechanised Battalion in Słupsk with BMP-1 infantry fighting vehicles
 3rd "Academic Legion" Mechanised Battalion in Trzebiatów with BMP-1 infantry fighting vehicles
 Artillery Group with 2S1 Gvozdika 122mm self-propelled howitzers
 Anti-aircraft Group with Hibneryt anti-aircraft systems and Grom surface-to-air missiles
 Reconnaissance Company
 Engineer Company 
 Logistic Battalion

References

 Polish Armed Forces (WP), 7th Coastal Defence Brigade

Army brigades of Poland
Marine corps units and formations
Military units and formations established in 2001